Henry I (c.1200–1252) was the hereditary Count of Vianden from 1210 and, through his wife, Marquis of Namur from 1229.

Family background
Henry was the son of Frederic III, Count of Vianden (de) (c. 1160 - 1210), and Mechthild (Mathilde) of Neuerburg (?), (b.c. 1130/1170 - c. 1200). At least his father married a Mechtild and another son, Frederick I, younger brother of Henry, inherited Neuerburg and married Cecilia of Isenburg, but that dynasty became extinct with the death of Frederick III of Neuerburg in 1332 (de).

Life
In 1216 Henry married Margaret, Marchioness of Namur, sometimes called "Sibilia" (c. 1194 - 17 July 1270), daughter of Peter II of Courtenay and Yolanda of Flanders. Margaret was the widow of Raoul, lord of Issoudun and thence Lady of Châteauneuf-sur-Cher and Mareuil-en-Berry. Margaret became Marchioness of Namur after the death of her brother Henry II, Marquis of Namur in 1229. Margaret and Henry ruled Namur (apparently as Henry III of Namur) until 1237 when they had to transfer Namur to Margaret's brother, emperor Baldwin II of Courtenay. Henry and Margaret continued ruling Vianden.
Henry V, Count of Luxembourg (1216 – 1281), maternal grandson of Henry IV, Count of Luxembourg (Henry I of Namur), invaded Namur and ruled it 1256-1264 as Henry IV (or III). Baldwin sold Namur in c. 1263 to his cousin Guy of Dampierre, count of Flanders and Henry IV was removed by military force but they made peace with family marriage.

After Henry's death in 1252, Margaret entered a convent in Marienthal.

Issue
Henry and Margaret had the following children:
 Matilda (c. 1216 - a. 1255), married around 1235 with John Angelos of Syrmia (c. 1193 - d. before 1253), Lord of Syrmia. They bore Maria Angelina (c. 1235 - a. 1285) whose husband Anseau de Cayeux (the younger) worked for Charles I of Naples. They also bore another daughter, Helena (c. 1236 – 1314), Queen consort of Serbia
 Peter, dean in cathedrals of Liège and Cologne (died after 1272)
 Frederic of Vianden. Frederic died in 1247 (5 years before his father). He married Mathilde of Salm (b.c. 1223), a daughter of Henry III, Count of Ardennes (seigneur de Viviers, c. 1190 - 1246 ?, married to Marguerite de Bar le Duc ?), and had a son named Henry, Lord of Schönecken (1248-1299) (de). 
 Henry I van Vianden (d. 1267), bishop of Utrecht from 1249 to 1267.
 Philip I (d. 1273), Count of Vianden 1252-1273. He married Marie of Brabant-Perwez, daughter of Godfrey of Louvain, Lord of Perwez, apparently a  descendant of Godfrey III, Count of Louvain and Landgrave of Brabant (1142-1190). Their issue was Godefroid I, Count of Vianden (d. 1307 or 1310) and four other children.
 Yolanda of Vianden (1231–1283), still revered today in Luxembourg

Ancestry

See also
Counts of Vianden

References

Sources

External links
 

Counts of Namur
Counts of Vianden
Vianden
House of Sponheim
Capetian House of Courtenay
House of Flanders
Year of birth unknown
1252 deaths
Christians of the Sixth Crusade